Mortician may refer to:
 A Funeral director
 Mortician (band), a death metal band
 Mortician (comics), a villain in Batman comics

See also
 Morticia